The Beacon Theatre was a cinema on Tremont Street in Boston, Massachusetts built in 1910 and closed in 1948. Jacob Lourie established it. Architect Clarence Blackall designed the building, with its 500-seat auditorium which a contemporary critic described as "showy." It had a staff of 26 in 1910. In 1948 the "refurbished" building became the Beacon Hill Theater. The building existed until 1970.

References

External links

 Bostonian Society. Photos:
 Tremont Street, c. 1936, with view of Beacon Theatre
 47-53 Tremont Street, c. 1945, with view of Beacon Theatre
 19-53 Tremont Street, 1947, with view of Beacon Theatre
 Tremont Street, c. 1953, with view of Beacon Hill Theatre
 53 Tremont Street, c. 1958, with view of Beacon Hill Theatre
 Boston Public Library. Photos of Beacon Hill Theatre, Tremont Street, 1970, before demolition; by Boston Redevelopment Authority:
 Front view 
 Close-up of architectural design -- third floor balcony
 Close-up of three floors
 Close-up of architectural design -- fourth floor balcony

Demolished buildings and structures in Boston
1910 establishments in Massachusetts
Cultural history of Boston
1910s in Boston
1940s in Boston
Former cinemas in the United States
Financial District, Boston
Buildings and structures demolished in 1970